Melvyn Charles Usselman (1944–2015) was a professor of chemistry at the University of Western Ontario (UWO), with a particular focus on the history of chemistry.

Life and career
He studied for his BSc, MA and PhD at UWO. He married Trixie Sennema. They had four children, Jasper, Charlotte, Richard and David.

He spent over 30 years researching eighteenth and nineteenth-century chemistry to write what has been called "his life's work", the first genuinely thorough biography of the English polymath and discoverer of the elements palladium and rhodium, William Hyde Wollaston, entitled Pure Intelligence: The Life of William Hyde Wollaston. In doing this as a professional chemist, he was also unconventional and dedicated enough as a biographer to try and reproduce Wollaston's experiments from the original notes, even going so far as to assay the actual samples that Wollaston had produced which were held by Michael Faraday.

In a similar vein, earlier publications and experiments of his concern the work of other chemists in their golden age of discovery, including the Frenchmen Jacques Étienne Bérard and Claude Louis Berthollet, the Englishmen John Dalton, Thomas Thomson and Smithson Tennant, and the German Justus von Liebig.

In 1994-5 he won the Edward G.Pleva Award for Excellence in Teaching. In 1996 he won an Ontario Confederation of University Faculty Association (OCUFA) Teaching and Academic Librarianship Award. He received the :de:Liebig-Wöhler-Freundschaftspreis in 2003 for his chemical history research. He was awarded a 2004-5 University Students' Council (USC) Teaching Excellence Award
 and the USC President's Medal for Innovation in Undergraduate Teaching in 2005. He was on the USC Honour Roll five years running from 1997-8.

He won a posthumous award in 2016, the Roy G. Neville Prize in Bibliography or Biography for his biography of Wollaston.

He died at Strathroy, Ontario on 23 March 2015 aged 70.

References

Academic staff of the University of Western Ontario
University of Western Ontario alumni
1944 births
2015 deaths
People from Strathroy-Caradoc
Canadian chemists
Canadian biographers